The 2017 Las Vegas shooting was a mass shooting during a music festival.

Las Vegas shooting may also refer to:

Las Vegas courthouse shooting in 2010
2014 Las Vegas shootings
A shooting by Zane Floyd in 1999 that killed four people

See also
 2022 Las Vegas Strip stabbings, a mass stabbing that killed 2 people and injured 6 others